Phyllomyias is a genus of small birds in the tyrant-flycatcher family Tyrannidae. They are found in wooded habitats of Central and South America. Some species are among the commonest birds in their range, while other are rare and threatened. They have a short, stubby bill, are greenish above, yellowish or whitish below, and all except the sooty-headed tyrannulet have pale wing-bars or edging. They feed on small arthropods and fruits. Most species regularly take part in mixed species flocks.

Species
The genus Phyllomyias contains 14 species:

References

 Fitzpatrick, J. W. (2004). Genus Phyllomyias. pp. 259–262 in: del Hoyo, J., A. Elliott, & D. A. Christie. eds (2004), Handbook of the Birds of the World. Vol. 9. Cotigas to Pittas and Wagtails. Lynx Edicions, Barcelona. 

 
Tyrannidae
Bird genera
Taxonomy articles created by Polbot